Bad Boy is a 1939 American film directed by Herbert Meyer written by Richard C. Kahn, edited by Roy Luby produced by gateway production, John H. Greenhalgh Jr. Cinematographer and music by Paul Marquardt. Bad Boy was released on 10 July 1939. The film is also known as Perilous Journey in the United Kingdom.

Cast
Johnny Downs as John Fraser
Rosalind Keith as Madelon Kirby
Helen MacKellar as Mrs. Fraser
Spencer Williams as Terry
Archie Robbins as Steve Carson
Holmes Herbert as Mr. McNeil
Richard Cramer as George
Harry E. Lang as Vanetti
Crane Whitley as Henchman

External links

1939 films
American black-and-white films
Monogram Pictures films
1939 crime drama films
American crime drama films
1930s English-language films
1930s American films